Antonio, or the Soldier's Return is an 1800 historical tragedy by the British writer William Godwin. It premiered at the Theatre Royal, Drury Lane on 13 December 1800. The cast included John Philip Kemble as Antonio, Sarah Siddons as Helena, William Barrymore as Don Gusman, Richard Wroughton as Don Pedro, Charles Kemble as Don Henry William Powell as Don Diego. Both the audience and critical reaction was negative. Seven years later another of Godwin's plays Faulkener was staged at the same theatre.

References

Bibliography
 Greene, John C. Theatre in Dublin, 1745-1820: A Calendar of Performances, Volume 6. Lexington Books, 2011.
 O'Shaughnessy, David. The Plays of William Godwin. Routledge, 2016.
 Nicoll, Allardyce. A History of Early Nineteenth Century Drama 1800-1850. Cambridge University Press, 1930.

1800 plays
West End plays
British plays
Historical plays
Plays set in the 15th century
Plays set in Spain
Works by William Godwin